Kamal Bhattacharya or Bhattacharjee (24 September 1915 – 10 December 1995) was an Indian cricketer. He played 35 first-class matches for Bengal between 1935 and 1947.

Bhattacharya was a prominent figure in the Bengal cricket community from the 1930 to the 1990s, first as an all-rounder in the Ranji Trophy, then as a radio commentator and coach. His best innings bowling figures came in a semi-final of the Ranji Trophy in 1943-44, when he took 7 for 83 in the second innings after making 67 in the first innings. His best match figures were 10 for 101 (6 for 41 and 4 for 60) against United Provinces in 1940-41.

See also
 List of Bengal cricketers

References

External links
 

1915 births
1995 deaths
Indian cricketers
Bengal cricketers
Cricketers from Kolkata
Indian cricket coaches
Indian cricket commentators